Hajjiabad (also Romanized as Ḩājjīābād and Hājīābād; also known as Hāiīābād) is a village in Rostaq Rural District, in the Central District of Neyriz County, Fars Province, Iran. At the 2006 census, its population was 396, in 98 families.

References 

Populated places in Neyriz County